Wilf Wedmann (April 17, 1948 – November 2021) was a Canadian high jumper, who represented his native country at the 1968 Summer Olympics in Mexico City, Mexico. A resident of Gloucester, British Columbia, he claimed the silver medal in the men's high jump event at the 1971 Pan American Games in Cali, Colombia. Wedmann died in November 2021, at the age of 73.

References

External links
 Canadian Olympic Committee

1948 births
2021 deaths
Place of birth missing
Canadian male high jumpers
Athletes (track and field) at the 1967 Pan American Games
Athletes (track and field) at the 1968 Summer Olympics
Athletes (track and field) at the 1971 Pan American Games
Olympic track and field athletes of Canada
Pan American Games silver medalists for Canada
Pan American Games medalists in athletics (track and field)
Medalists at the 1971 Pan American Games
20th-century Canadian people
21st-century Canadian people